Mustafa Taj Colony is a neighbourhood in the Korangi District in eastern Karachi, Pakistan. It was previously part of Korangi Town, which was an administrative unit that was disbanded in 2011.

Neighbourhoods
 Rahimabad
 Mustafa Taj Colony
 Sectors 48-B and 48-F

Demographics
Majority of people living in this area are Sindhi & Urdu-speaking (Pakistan)|Muhajirs]].

References

External links 
 Karachi Website.

Neighbourhoods of Karachi
Korangi Town